World Organization for Islamic Services or WOFIS is an Iranian, Tehran based Shi'a Twelver publishing company.

They translate, research and write original Islamic books regarding hadith, Tafsir and the history of Islam as well as other Shi'a topics.

Several of their publications are available on Google Books

References

External links
http://www.wofis.com/

Islamic publishing companies